Astronaut Glacier is a broad glacier, tributary to upper Aviator Glacier, flowing south-west and joining the latter just west of Parasite Cone in Victoria Land. It was named by the northern party of the New Zealand Geological Survey Antarctic Expedition, 1962–63, in association with nearby Aeronaut Glacier.

See also
 List of glaciers in the Antarctic
 Glaciology

References
 

Glaciers of Borchgrevink Coast